Roberto López (born 31 July 1993) is a Salvadoran rower. He competed in the men's single sculls event at the 2012 Summer Olympics.

References

1993 births
Living people
Salvadoran male rowers
Olympic rowers of El Salvador
Rowers at the 2012 Summer Olympics
Sportspeople from San Salvador
21st-century Salvadoran people